The following is a timeline of the history of the city of Bordeaux, France.

Prior to 19th century

 107 BCE - Battle of Burdigala
 412 CE - Bordeaux taken by forces of Goth Adolphus.
 732 CE - Bordeaux taken by Ummayad forces 
 1096 - Bordeaux Cathedral consecrated.
 1137 - 25 July: Wedding of Eleanor of Aquitaine and Louis VII of France in Bordeaux Cathedral.
 1152 - Wedding of Eleanor of Aquitaine and Henry II of England
 1154 - Aquitaine passes under the control of English Kings.
 1441 - University of Bordeaux founded.
 1453 - Battle of Castillon, Bordeaux and Aquitaine pass from English to French control.
 1460 - Hâ Fort built.
 1486 - Printing press in operation.
 1494 - Porte du Caillau (gate) built.
 1500 - Tour Pey-Berland built.
 1533 - College of Guienne founded.
 1548 - Locals resist the salt-tax (Gabelle) and were punished by Anne de Montmorency.
 1581 - Michel de Montaigne becomes mayor.
 1676 -  consecrated.
 1712 -  established.
 1740 - Bordeaux municipal library opens.
 1775 - Place de la Bourse built.
 1780 - Grand Théâtre de Bordeaux inaugurated.
 1784 - Palais Rohan built.
 1790 - Bordeaux becomes part of the Gironde souveraineté.
 1793 - Population: 104,676.
 1796 -  established.

19th century
 1801 - Musée des Beaux-Arts de Bordeaux established.
 1802 - Chamber of Commerce established.
 1814 - Declared itself for the House of Bourbon.
 1818 -  founded.
 1820 - Population: 92,375.
 1822 - Pont de pierre (bridge) opens.
 1831 - Maurel & Prom in business.
 1834 - Société de Pharmacie de Bordeaux founded.
 1835 - City hall moves to the Palais Rohan.
 1841 - Population: 104,686.
 1858 - Jardin botanique de Bordeaux established.
 1860 -  (bridge) built.
 1861 - Population: 162,750.
 1862 - 13 July: City hall burns down.
 1866 - Population: 194,241.
 1872 - Petite Gironde newspaper begins publication.
 1874 -  (geographical society) founded.
 1876 - Population: 215,140.
 1880 - Société bordelaise de Crédit Industriel et Commercial established.
 1898 - Bontou's  cookbook published.

20th century

 1903 - July: 1903 Tour de France passes through Bordeaux.
 1906 - Population: 237,707.
 1907 - Construction of new docks was begun.
 1911 - Population: 261,678.
 1932 - Rex cinema opens.
 1938 - Stade du Parc Lescure opens.
 1940 - BETASOM submarine base established by Italian forces.
 1944 - Sud-Ouest newspaper begins publication.
 1962 - France 3 Aquitaine television begins broadcasting.
 1963 - Musée d'Aquitaine established.
 1964 - Sister city relationship established with Los Angeles, USA.
 1965 -  (bridge) opens.
 1967 - Pont d'Aquitaine (bridge) built.
 1968
 Bordeaux Métropole established.
 Population: 266,662.
 1970 - Bordeaux Segalen University established.
 1980 - Orchestre National Bordeaux Aquitaine active.
 1988 - Bordeaux International School established.
 1992 - Socialist Party national congress held in Bordeaux.
 1995 - Alain Juppé becomes mayor.
 1998 - Some 1998 FIFA World Cup football games held in Bordeaux.

21st century

 2003 - Bordeaux tramway begins operating.
 2004
 Station Hôtel de Ville (Tram de Bordeaux) opens.
  becomes mayor.
 2006 - Alain Juppé becomes mayor again.
 2007 
  designated an UNESCO World Heritage Site.
 Population: 235,178.
 2012 - Population: 241,287.
 2013 - Pont Jacques Chaban-Delmas (bridge) opens.
 2015 - December:  held.
 2016 - Bordeaux becomes part of the Nouvelle-Aquitaine region.
 2017 - Population: 254,436.

See also
 Bordeaux history
 
 List of mayors of Bordeaux
 

Other cities in the Nouvelle-Aquitaine region:
 Timeline of La Rochelle
 Timeline of Limoges
 Timeline of Poitiers

References

This article incorporates information from the French Wikipedia.

Bibliography

in English

in French
 
 
 
 
  (Table of contents)

External links

 Map of Bordeaux, 1985
 Items related to Bordeaux, various dates (via Europeana)
 Items related to Bordeaux, various dates (via Digital Public Library of America)

Bordeaux
bordeaux
Bordeaux